The Selk crater is a crater on Titan, a moon of Saturn, located at 7°N 199°W. It is a geologically young impact crater that measures approximately  in diameter.

There is evidence of the past presence of organic compounds and liquid water in the crater, which is set to be studied in the planned Dragonfly mission. The initial landing site will be in the dunes to the Southeast of Selk.

The crater is named after Serket, the Egyptian goddess of knowledge, writing, education, and reptiles, and was formally approved by the IAU in 2008.

References 

Impact craters on Saturn's moons
Surface features of Titan (moon)